Afidentula bisquadripunctata, is a species of lady beetle found in India, Pakistan, China, Sri Lanka and Nepal.

Description
Body length is about 4.00 to 4.10 mm. Body round-oval, and convex. Body surfaces distinctly setose with yellowish hairs. Head, mouthparts, pronotum, scutellum, legs, prosternum and mesoventrite are orange to light brown in color. Metaventrite is light brown, brownish or blackish. Elytra orange to light brown with four black spots arranged as 1–2–1. Antenna consists with 8 antennomeres. Legs are moderately long.

Host plants are Apluda mutica and Arthraxon hispidulus.

References 

Coccinellidae
Insects of Sri Lanka
Beetles described in 1808